Carole Matthews is a successful and popular British author, famous for her sense of humour and her romantic comedy novels. Her books have sold over 6.8 million books worldwide and have been published in more than 31 countries. In 2011, Matthews was inducted into the Festival of Romance Hall of Fame for her outstanding contribution to romance writing.

Biography
Matthews was born in St Helens, Merseyside in 1960 and was always an avid reader. She attended Champneys College where she studied Beauty Therapy. She has worked as a secretary, ice-cream lady, television presenter, beauty therapist and freelance writer. Her first book was Let's Meet on Platform Eight and was published in 1997.

Her latest book is Christmas for Beginners.

In 2021 Carole won the Romantic Novelists' Association - Romantic Novel of the Year Award. For Sunny days and Sea Breezes.

She has published 34 novels and has appeared on the Sunday Times and USA Today bestsellers lists and her books, Welcome To The Real World, Wrapped up in You and Happiness for Beginners made the shortlist for the Romantic Novelists' Association - Romantic Novel of the Year Award.

Her 4th book For Better, For Worse, was picked in summer 2002 for a TV book club pick in America, Reading with Ripa, on the show Live with Regis and Kelly. She has sold over 6.8 million books worldwide and is published in more than 31 countries. She has had more than 4.5 million library lends in the United Kingdom since she started writing.

In 2011, she was inducted into the Festival of Romance Hall of Fame for her outstanding contribution to romance writing.

In 2015 Carole was presented with an Outstanding Achievement Award from the Romantic Novelists' Association for 25 novels which have consistently appeared in bestseller lists, and for her continued championing of the RNA and romantic fiction.

As well as writing, Matthews has also been a television presenter and is a regular radio guest. 

She lives in Milton Keynes with her husband, Kevin, who she regularly refers to as 'Lovely Kev.'

UK Books

References

External links
Official website

Living people
British romantic fiction writers
1960 births
People from St Helens, Merseyside